The 2005–06 Polska Liga Hokejowa season was the 71st season of the Polska Liga Hokejowa, the top level of ice hockey in Poland. Eight teams participated in the league, and KS Cracovia won the championship.

Regular season

Playoffs

External links
 Season on hockeyarchives.info

Polska Hokej Liga seasons
Polska
Polska